The large moth subfamily Lymantriinae contains the following genera beginning with M:

References 

Lymantriinae
Lymantriid genera M